Jodhpur Division (also known as Marwar) is the biggest division among all in Rajasthan (Rajputana). The division comprises in six districts named Barmer, Jaisalmer, Sirohi, Jalore, Jodhpur, Pali.

References

 
Divisions of Rajasthan